Anthony Townsend Kronman (born May 12, 1945) is a Sterling Professor at Yale Law School specializing in contracts, bankruptcy, jurisprudence, social theory, and professional responsibility. He was the dean of Yale Law School from 1994 to 2004.

Early life

Kronman was raised in Los Angeles, California, the son of Harry Kronman, a Hollywood screenwriter, and actress Rosella Towne (birth name Rosella Townsend).

Education

Kronman received a Bachelor of Arts from Williams College in 1968, a Doctor of Philosophy philosophy from Yale University in 1972, and Juris Doctor from Yale Law School in 1975.
He was an editor of the Yale Law Journal when he studied at Yale Law School.

Career

He taught at the University of Minnesota Law School from 1975 to 1976, and the University of Chicago Law School from 1976 to 1978, before joining the Yale faculty. In addition to the courses that Kronman teaches at Yale Law School, he also teaches undergraduate classes in literature, philosophy, and history and politics as part of the Directed Studies program at Yale. Outside of his academic obligations, Kronman is of counsel at the law firm of Boies, Schiller & Flexner.

Views on diversity 
Kronman has characterized contemporary diversity campaigns as a political not educational ideal. In his 2019 book Assault on American Excellence, he criticized Yale's decisions to change the title of "master" to "head of college" and to rename "Calhoun College". He rebuked University President Peter Salovey's lack of support for the Christakises, who were targeted by students during a 2015 protest over inclusivity and free discourse. Other members of the university community disagreed with Kronman's positions.

Bibliography

References

External links
 Kronman's profile at Yale Law School's website
 

1945 births
Living people
American modern pagans
Boies Schiller Flexner people
Converts from Judaism
Deans of Yale Law School
Modern pagans of Jewish descent
Modern pagan writers
Academic staff of New York University Abu Dhabi
Williams College alumni
Yale Law School alumni
Yale Law School faculty
Yale Sterling Professors